Patrick (Bischoff) Brown (born August 26, 1978, in Phoenix, Arizona) is an American engineer, producer and studio owner. He has been the CEO of several record labels, including Brown Bottle Records and Different Fur Studios.  He is the current owner of Different Fur Studios in the Mission district of San Francisco, California.

Biography

Brown spent his early life in Arizona and later moved to Long Island, New York, where he studied web design. He found out that he had a talent for recording after working on various projects with friends and helping friends' bands record. Because of this talent Brown moved to San Francisco in 1998 where, after getting settled, he attended Ex'pression College for Digital Arts. In 2004, during his final semester at Ex'pression, Brown was hired as an Intern at Different Fur. There he was given his first solo session, Gordon Gano from The Violent Femmes. 2006 marked a turning point for the studio because Brown helped bring in various bands through iTunes' Live Sessions. In 2007 Brown purchased the studio from Jeremy Smith. Most studios are not owned by engineers, but Brown purposefully wanted to create a studio that focused on this aspect of the recording process. As owner, he morphed the business model by bringing in more interns, because Brown believes it takes a community of passionately involved people to really create something worthwhile. Since Brown's purchase of the studio, he has been credited as an owner who has "modernized the studio without losing any of the building's pastoral charm".

Brown's work has been featured on Pitchfork, Stereogum, Urb, Fader, PrefixMag, Imposemagazine, Vice, Noisey, Spinner, Hybebeast, Spin.com, iTunes New & Noteworthy, iTunes Indie Spotlight, WorldStar HipHop, 2dopeboys, The Owl Mag, Live 105, "Chronicle" the movie, a Reese's Peanut Butter Cup commercial, The Bay Bridged, Impose Magazine, The Bold Italic, Playboy, and his work with The Morning Benders was voted iTunes Indie album of the year in 2008.

Recording Technique
As an engineer, Brown is constantly focused on the sound and vibe in the room. He pays attention to who is coming in and out, the reactions of people, and who needs coaxing in one direction or another. He views being an engineer as an art form in and of itself because he has to look at the sound being put to tape on different levels – the musician's, the consumer's, the technical side, and the sonic side – and balance all of these levels at the same time. According to Brown, "it's sort of like a balance between the performance itself and the actual sound, you know, you're deciding which is more important or how to get both. And they're completely different things."

That being said, Brown feels he is an under-producer in that he wants to hear the emotion behind the artist and his/her songs first and foremost. "All in all, I'll do everything I can to make sure things sound the way you expect, and hopefully even better, so that when you leave you are proud of what we've accomplished."

Brown also focuses on trying to get bands to their next place. He constantly thinks about getting artists more attention for their music, which starts with the recording itself, but also includes getting fans out to their shows, telling people about the record, and finding new ways of getting records into the hands of fans.

Brown plans to keep the studio on the creative cutting-edge and in 2011 completed an upgrade accompanied by construction. He is also content to keep the studio focused on local bands and local labels, including Tricycle Records and Omega Records. However, this doesn't prevent the occasional big-name artist from stopping by. And while Brown will focus on getting out the sounds a band wants in their song, he is also going to make sure they're comfortable. Plus, if an artist does something funny, chances are he will tweet about it.

Influences
Growing up, Brown was a fan of artists he first heard through his Mom, including Paul Simon, Billy Joel, and Neil Young. He also listened to a lot of late 1980s and early 1990s pop like Technotronic, Lisa Lisa, MC Hammer, and a lot of Bobby Brown. In fact, Bobby Brown's Don't Be Cruel, which was recorded at Different Fur Studios, is an influential album for Patrick Brown.

Brown is a fan of very few engineers but is constantly evaluating other people's works and learning from them. Engineers that Brown finds influential include Russell Elevado, Tony Maserati, and Tom Dowd. However, he draws more inspiration from producers and musicians like Morris Day, Prince, D'angelo, Biggie, Funkadelic's album Maggot Brain, the first N.E.R.D. record, and the first Kenna record. Overall, Brown is influenced by those people and records that have challenged what has been established. This is what helps him grow the most as an engineer, producer, and studio owner; and it is the type of person Brown aims to be.

Discography

Albums

2006
 Karpov – Soliloquy
 Transdub Massiv – Negril To Kingston City
 FM Fatale – Soft Life for Killers
 Vienna Teng – Dreaming Through The Noise

2007
 The Most Holy Trinity – Rituals for Parting
 Chow Nasty – Super Electrical Recordings
 Gravy Train!!!! – All The Sweet Stuff

2008
 Michael Franti & Spearhead – All Rebel Rockers
 The Morning Benders – Talking Through Tin Cans
 Alison Harris – Smoke rings in the sky
 Morley – Seen
 Big Light – Big Light

2009
 Trainwreck Riders – The Perch
 So Many Wizards – Tree

2010
 Flexx Bronco –  Volume 2: Off the Record
 The Morning Benders – Big Echo
 Gomorran Social Aid Club – The Gomorran Social Aid and Pleasure Club

2010 (continued)
 The Gomorrans – Giving Birth To Love
 Victor Harris – Midnight at Malibu
 A B & The Sea – Christmas (Baby Please Come Home)

2011
 NeaCombo Diffuzion – Round 2 Digital Attack (Mastering)
 Lowered (Mastering)
 Alessandra – So Nice
 Dylan Fox And The Wave – Tunnel Vision
 A B & The Sea – Run Run Run
 The Park – The Process...
 Zodiac Death Valley – Zodiac Death Valley
 Le Panique – Saturday Matinee
 Lilac – Lilac

2012
 Sourpatch – Stagger and Fade
 A B & The Sea – Constant Vacation
 Lilac – Christine
 The Park featuring Darondo and Happy Mayfield – The Silvercloud Time Machine (7")
 Nate Mercereau – $1,000,000 Worth of Twang
 Buttercream Gang – Oh Brother
 Illusion of Self – Illusion of Self

EP's
 2010 A B & The Sea – Boys and Girls
 2011 The Park – These Are The Days
 2011 The Cold Volts – People Noise
 2011 Dylan Fox and The Wave - Tunnel Vision
 2011 Bird Call – Other Creatures (co-engineered)
 2011 A B & The Sea – Run Run Run!
 2011 Ash Reiter – Heatwave
 2011 Lilac – Lilac
 2012 Starred – Prison to Prison

Live Session (iTunes exclusive)
 2007 Black Lips. iTunes link
 2007 Rodrigo y Gabriela. iTunes link
 2007 Mew. iTunes link
 2007 Jack Ingram. iTunes link
 2007 Gomez. iTunes link
 2008 OneRepublic. iTunes link
 2008 Tristan Prettyman. iTunes link
 2008 The Blakes. iTunes link
 2008 Tegan and Sara. iTunes link
 2008 Amos Lee. iTunes link.

Singles
 2006 Hey Willpower – P.D.A. (US Bonus Track)
 2009 Skin & Bones, featuring Chris Chu, Bernie Worrell and 88 keys – Lemonade (Executive Producer/Engineer)
 2009 A B & The Sea – Suzie/Yellow-Haired Girl
 2011 Skin & Bones, featuring Izza Kizza and Bernie Worrell – Holdn’ Back
 2011 The Park – Belleville
 2011 Skin & Bones – Stomp / Pop Painkillaz (remix)
 2012 Midi Matilda – Love & The Movies
 2012 Grillade – I'd Love to Change the World 2012 Surf Club – Reverie 2012 Swiftumz – Willy 2012 Dirty Ghosts – Eyes of a Stranger 2012 Woof – Get it Right 2012 Woof – Grimer feat. Antwon & Swiftumz
 2012 Woof – Black Roses feat. G-Side, Tragik & Doe Eye
 2012 Woof – Woolybrain

Videos

2008
 The Morning Benders – Waiting for a War
 The Morning Benders – Boarded Doors

2009
 Skin&Bones – Mistah Fab
 Flexx Bronco – Pop

2010
 Toro y Moi – You Hid
 Chromeo – Don't Walk Away
 Chromeo – J'ai Claque La Porte
 The Morning Benders – Resse's Commercial
 The Morning Benders – All Day All Night
 The Morning Benders – Promises

2011
 Ash Reiter – Heatwave
 Bird Call – Other Creatures EP (behind the scenes)
 Sourpatch – Cynthia Ann
 Grimes – Vanessa and Oblivion
 Lilac – So Young
 Sun Airway – Oh Naoko
 Lower Dens – Batman
 Yuck – Policeman 
 UMO – How Can You Luv Me
 Bobby – Groggy
 Zola Jesus- Vesse
 Araabmuzik – In My Room
 The Park – These are the Days

2011 (continued)
 The Park – Belleville
 The Park – Belle
 Pat Parra – Forget Your Love
 Twin Sister – Stop
 Lia Ices – Ice Wine
 Zodiac Death Valley – The Room

2012
 Lilac – Shame
 Dam Funk & Master Blaster – Songs from Scratch
 B. Bravo and The Starship Connection – The Roll Out
 Blind Pilot – Half Moon
 Of Montreal – dour percentage
 The Walkmen – The Love You Love
 Lee Fields and the Expressions – Faithful Man
 Gary Clark Jr – Bright Lights and When My Train Pulls In
 Alabama Shakes – Boys and Girls and I Ain't The Same
 Charli XCX – You're the One and Stay Away
 Nicolas Jaar – Variations and Why Didn't You Save Me
 Bear in Heaven – Warm Water and World of Freakout
 Kendrick Lamar and ScHoolboy Q – Hol' Up and A.D.H.D. w/ Hands on the Wheel
 The Park – Jesse James w/ Darondo
 American Hipster Presents – Episode #4 w/ YT and the Walkmen
 American Hipster Presents – Paavo Explores the Studio (behind the scenes)
 A B & the Sea – Short Straight Bangs teaser
 A B & the Sea – Taking It All Away teaser
 A B & the Sea – California Feeling teaser
 Midi Matilda – Love & The Movies
 Nick Waterhouse – Some Place

References

1978 births
Living people
Record producers from Arizona
Businesspeople from Phoenix, Arizona